The 1949 Manchester BEA Douglas DC-3 accident occurred when a twin-engined British European Airways Douglas DC-3 (registration: G-AHCY) crashed on Saddleworth Moor in the Pennines near Oldham, Lancashire, after a flight from Belfast. The accident killed 24 of the passengers and crew on board. The aircraft had first flown in 1944, and was captained by F. W. Pinkerton, a former RAF serviceman who, as a sergeant, had been posted missing during World War II. The airline was government-owned.

Accident
The aircraft took off from Belfast Nutts Corner Airport at 10:58 on 19 August 1949 on a short-haul flight to Manchester Airport, with twenty-nine passengers and either three or four crew members on board. US newspaper reports, using agency reports filed soon after the incident, favour the former number of crew; Flight Magazine, reporting a little time later, favoured the latter.

An hour after take-off, at 11:59, the last radio contact with the crew occurred and about one minute later the aircraft crashed. It was flying at approximately  when it hit a mist-covered hill at Wimberry Stones, near to the Chew Valley on Saddleworth Moor near Oldham,  from Manchester Airport. The aircraft broke up and caught fire. Twenty-one passengers and all the crew members died, leaving eight survivors.

The dead passengers were eleven women, six men and four children, three of whom were aged under two years; the three crew members were all male. All but two of the dead died at the scene. The injured were treated at Oldham Infirmary. The rescue was hampered by bad weather and the remote location of the crash site. There were a few survivors lying groaning on the hillside but some of them died before I could attend to them. I have been a doctor since 1914 and served in both wars, but this was the worst sight that I have ever seen." The cause of the accident was an error in navigation, incorrect approach procedure and failure to check the position of the aircraft accurately before the descent from a safe height.

All four of its passengers died.

References

Further reading
 – short film clip of the scene after the crash

Aviation accidents and incidents in 1949
Aviation accidents and incidents in England
Accidents and incidents involving the Douglas C-47 Skytrain
19490819
Aviation accidents and incidents in Greater Manchester
1940s in Lancashire
August 1949 events in the United Kingdom
Airliner accidents and incidents in the United Kingdom
1949 disasters in the United Kingdom